Temein is an ethnic group in the Nuba Hills in Sudan. They speak Temein, a Nilo-Saharan language. They likely number more than 10,000.

References
Joshua Project

Ethnic groups in Sudan